J73 could refer to:

General Electric J73, a type of jet engine
 HMS Niger (J73), A British minesweeper
Johnson solid J73, a geometric shape
JOVIAL J73, a computer programming language
LNER Class J73, a class of British steam locomotives
TransMilenio J73, a Colombian bus rapid transit route